Igor Ishutko (born 30 January 1983) is a Ukrainian freestyle skier. He competed in the men's aerials event at the 2006 Winter Olympics.

References

1983 births
Living people
Ukrainian male freestyle skiers
Olympic freestyle skiers of Ukraine
Freestyle skiers at the 2006 Winter Olympics
Sportspeople from Mykolaiv